Alison Fesq Haislip is an American actress and former television personality for Attack of the Show! on the first incarnation of the G4 network and the NBC reality singing competition show The Voice.

Early life
Haislip is a native of Tewksbury Township, New Jersey and a graduate of Voorhees High School. She graduated with honors from Boston College, having studied theater. She also trained at the British American Drama Academy. Afterwards, she moved to Los Angeles to pursue her acting career.

Attack of the Show!

In October 2007, Haislip landed at G4 after being told by a G4 employee, who was a patron where she worked as a bartender, that she would be a great fit at the network. Haislip hosted "The Feed" segment and did correspondent work numerous times for Attack of the Show! before being hired full-time around Spring 2008. She often substituted as the show's co-host for Olivia Munn.

For most of 2010, in addition to her pre-filmed segments and occasional guest hosting, she also shared responsibility for presenting "The Feed" with Blair Herter, typically anchoring it live on two of the four days that Attack of the Show! aired per week.

On November 7, 2011, Haislip announced during a hosting appearance on Attack of the Show! that she was leaving G4.

Other projects and appearances
From May 2008 to February 2009, Haislip hosted a weekly podcast ranging in length from two to five minutes for G4's website. Tech News went on an indefinite hiatus as part of the network's financial cutbacks. Haislip and Blair Herter co-hosted the first season of American Ninja Warrior. She was the sideline reporter for the second and third seasons. Haislip was the sideline and behind the scenes reporter for the sixth and seventh seasons of the ABC reality competition show BattleBots.

In September 2008, in correlation with the launch of her own official website, Haislip started releasing approximately four to six minute unedited video updates to stay more connected with her fans. Topics have ranged from answering fan questions posted on her forums to giving updates on her upcoming segments for Attack of the Show! before they air. Occasionally, Haislip had a guest alongside her while filming the blog. Past guests include fellow G4 personalities Kevin Pereira and Blair Herter, actress/dancer/writer Imogen Church, and Alison's younger brother, Greg Haislip.

Starting in mid-May 2009, Ford Fiesta Movement mission videos, and Baaaznian Production short films, replaced the original blog format of Haislip's videos. The second to last video blog or "vlog" format video, it was uploaded on May 11, 2009. However, a brief Christmas vlog was uploaded on December 24, 2009, in which Haislip explained she had stopped making vlogs because she has been much busier in the recent months, than in the first half of 2009.

In spring 2009, Haislip began making additional videos, as required by her involvement with the Ford Fiesta Movement, a campaign in which she was one of 100 people to win one of the cars for six months, started by Ford Motor Company to help promote the model's then-upcoming U.S. release.

Beginning in June 2009, Haislip has appeared in a number of short HD films, along with a troupe of actors. They are currently available for viewing on YouTube. The first film, entitled "New Moongasm - A New Moon Parody", was uploaded on June 15, 2009. Her next short film was titled "Hi. I'm Joel Rush.", which was released on June 29, 2009. A third film, titled "Love Automatically", was uploaded on July 26, 2009. "Love Automatically" was also directed by Haislip.

On March 28, 2011, it was announced that Haislip would join the cast of the NBC reality singing competition series The Voice as the backstage and social networking correspondent for season one. Her position allowed her to tweet what is happening in the competition, as well as talk to contestants backstage in the "V Room". She was replaced by Christina Milian for season two.

In 2012, Haislip joined The Morning After, a Hulu original web series, as co-host. She remain with the show until the web series ended on April 24, 2014.

Also in May 2012, Haislip began co-hosting a new show on the Nerdist YouTube channel titled 4 Points with Alex Albrecht. Haislip and Alex Albrecht discuss four topics with a member of the Nerdist community as well as a celebrity, usually known for their work in television or movies. In May 2014, it was announced that Haislip had joined Team Unicorn, replacing Michele Boyd as "Blue Unicorn". On April 6, 2015, Haislip began co-hosting a new show on the Nerdist Network titled: "Half Hour Happy Hour". Also in 2015, Haislip appeared in Alan Tudyk's web series Con Man as Faith.

Filmography

Film

Television

References

External links

 
 

21st-century American actresses
Actresses from Los Angeles
Actresses from New Jersey
American television actresses
Television personalities from Los Angeles
American women television personalities
Living people
Participants in American reality television series
People from Tewksbury Township, New Jersey
Voorhees High School alumni